Clonalis House, Castlerea, County Roscommon, Ireland, is the ancestral home of the O'Conor Don, who is a direct descendant Cathal Crobhdearg Ua Conchobair, King of Connacht, a younger brother of the last High King of Ireland, Ruaidrí Ua Conchobair.

Clonalis was constructed in 1878 by Charles Owen O'Conor as a replacement for an earlier house on the same site which was frequently damaged by flooding. Built of mass concrete, its design by Frederick Pepys Cockerell is of a mixture of styles drawing on the traditions of Italianate and Queen Anne Style architecture.

Its history reflects the turbulence of Irish history having once been occupied by the Irish Republican Army before it was shelled and captured by Free State Forces during the Irish Civil War.

Some 100,000 volumes are contained in the family archives and library of the O'Conor Don which are still held at Clonalis House, making it a valuable repository of Irish history.

Further reading
 O'Connor, Roderic, A Historical and Genealogical Memoir of the O'Connors, Kings of Connaught, and their Descendants. Dublin: McGlashan & Gill. 1861.
 O'Donovan, John and the Rt. Hon. Charles Owen O'Conor Don, The O'Conors of Connaught: An Historical Memoir. Dublin: Hodges, Figgis, and Co. 1891.

External links

Buildings and structures in County Roscommon
Houses in the Republic of Ireland
O'Conor dynasty
Historic house museums in the Republic of Ireland
Museums in County Roscommon